The Boross government was the second cabinet of Hungary after the fall of Communism. It was established on 21 December 1993 under the leadership of Péter Boross, as a coalition of the Hungarian Democratic Forum, United Smallholders' Party and Christian Democratic People's Party.  It was formed after the death in office of Prime Minister József Antall on 12 December 1993, upon which the then interior minister Boross became acting prime minister immediately. He was later confirmed in office with a vote of 201 members of parliament over a week later.  The cabinet was essentially unchanged from Antall's, with the exception of Imre Kónya taking over Boross's former post of Interior Minister.  The government was defeated in the 1994 Hungarian parliamentary election, and subsequently Boross resigned on 15 July 1994 in favor of Gyula Horn.

Party breakdown
Party breakdown of cabinet ministers:

Composition

References 

József Bölöny: Magyarország kormányai 1848–2004 (Governments of Hungary from 1848 to 2004) Az 1987–2004 közötti időszakot feldolgozta és sajtó alá rendezte Hubai László. 5. bővített és javított kiadás. (the period between 1987 and 2004 was written by László Hubai) Budapest, Akadémiai Kiadó. 2004. ISBN 963-05-8106-X

Hungarian governments
1993 establishments in Hungary
1994 disestablishments in Hungary
Cabinets established in 1993
Cabinets disestablished in 1994